Morrinsville College is a state secondary school located in Morrinsville, Waikato, New Zealand. The school has a roll of approximately  students from years 9 to 13 (approx ages 13 to 18) as of 

The school dates back to 1923 when Morrinsville School (established 1877) opened a secondary department and became Morrinsville District High School. The district high school was split into separate primary and secondary schools in 1950, forming the current Morrinsville School and Morrinsville College.

Notable alumni 

 Jacinda Ardern – former prime minister of New Zealand
 David Mitchell – architect
 Vaughan Smith - Current radio presenter ZM Fletch, Vaughan and Hayley

References

External links 

 
 

Secondary schools in Waikato
Educational institutions established in 1950
1950 establishments in New Zealand